The seventh and final season of Offspring, an Australian drama television series, premiered on Network TEN on 28 June 2017.

On 4 November 2016, the series was renewed for a seventh season set to air in 2017. Production for the series began in March 2017 in Melbourne.

Cast

Main
Asher Keddie as Nina Proudman
Kat Stewart as Billie Proudman
Richard Davies as Jimmy Proudman
Deborah Mailman as Cherie Butterfield
Jane Harber as Zara Perkich Proudman
Linda Cropper as Geraldine Proudman
Alexander England as Harry Crewe
Alicia Gardiner as Kim Akerholt
T.J. Power as Will Bowen

Supporting
 Ash Ricardo as Kerry Green
 Shannon Berry as Brody Jordan
 Lawrence Leung as Elvis Kwan
 Sarah Peirse as Marjorie Van Dyke
 Cate Wolfe as Jess
 Isabella Monaghan as Zoe Proudman-Reid
 Adrienne Pickering as Kirsty Crewe
 David Roberts as Phil D'Arabont
 Neil Melville as Drew Crewe

Guest 
 Osher Günsberg as The Bachelor Australia host

Episodes

Viewership

References 

2017 Australian television seasons
Television works about intersex